Classic Example is the only studio album by American contemporary R&B group Classic Example, released  via Hollywood Records. The album was co-produced by Cecil Holmes and Maurice Starr. It did not chart in the United States; however, the lead single, "It's Alright", peaked at #68 on the Billboard Hot 100.

In addition to original songs, the album contains a cover of the Cherrelle song "Where Do I Run to", as well as a rendition of the traditional hymn "Lift Every Voice and Sing".

Track listing

A.

References

External links
 
 

1992 debut albums
Albums produced by Cecil Holmes (music executive)
Albums produced by Maurice Starr
Contemporary R&B albums by American artists
Hollywood Records albums